The Cytotoxic hazard symbol is a hazard symbol consisting of a triangle with the letter "C" inside it. It is used to label biomedical waste bags and containers.

Cytotoxic waste, the by-product of cytotoxic drug therapy administered to patients (such as chemotherapy), typically includes all drug administrative equipment (e.g. needles, syringes, dripsets etc.) as well as all gowns and body fluids/waste from patients undergoing such treatment.

See also
Hazard symbol

References

Infographics
Occupational safety and health